The 1985–86 Football League Cup (known as the Milk Cup for sponsorship reasons) was the 26th season of the Football League Cup, a knockout competition for England's top 92 football clubs.

The competition began on 20 August 1985, and ended with the final on 20 April 1986 at the Old Wembley Stadium. The cup was won by Oxford United, who beat Queens Park Rangers 3–0 in the final, to win their first major cup silverware. It was Oxford United's first season in Division One. Goals from Trevor Hebberd, Ray Houghton and Jeremy Charles sealed the victory. TV coverage of this competition only began after Christmas following the "blackout" where no club matches were shown for the first half of the season, and there was no UEFA Cup place for the winners as a result of the ban on English clubs that followed the Heysel Stadium disaster.

First round
A total of 56 teams took part in the First Round. All of the Third Division and Fourth Division sides entered, with eight of the Second Division clubs also starting in this round. The eight clubs consisted of the three teams promoted from the Third Division and the five teams finishing 15th to 19th in the Second Division from the 1984–85 season. Each tie was played across two legs.

Second round
A total of 64 teams took part in the Second Round, including the 28 winners from round one. The remaining Second Division clubs entered in this round, as well as the 22 sides from the First Division. Each tie was again played across two legs.

Third round
A total of 32 teams took part in the Third Round, all 32 winners from round two. Unlike the previous two rounds, this round was played over one leg.

Ties

Replays

Fourth round
A total of 16 teams took part in the Fourth Round, all 16 winners from round three. Once again this round was played over one leg.

Ties

Replays

2nd Replay

Fifth round
The eight winners from the Fourth Round took part in the Fifth Round. Once again this round was played over one leg.

Ties

Replays

Semi-finals
As with the first two rounds, the semi-final ties were played over two legs. Favourites Liverpool, in search of a unique domestic treble, were surprisingly beaten by QPR, while Oxford United eased past Aston Villa in the other semi-final.

First leg

Second leg

QPR win 3–2 on aggregate

Oxford win 4–3 on aggregate

Final

References

General

Specific

External links
Official Carling Cup website

EFL Cup seasons
1985–86 domestic association football cups
Lea
Cup